Newfound Blob may refer to:

 Lyman-alpha blob 1 (LAB-1), one of the first discovered Lyman-alpha blobs
 Himiko (Lyman-alpha blob)
 EQ J221734.0+001701, the SSA22 Protocluster
 a gas cloud orbiting Sagittarius A*
 the magma plume causing the African superswell